Yannick Peeters (born ) is a Belgian male  cyclo-cross cyclist. He competed in the men's under-23 event at the 2016 UCI Cyclo-cross World Championships  in Heusden-Zolder.

References

External links
 Profile at cyclingarchives.com

1996 births
Living people
Cyclo-cross cyclists
Belgian male cyclists
Place of birth missing (living people)
People from La Louvière
Cyclists from Hainaut (province)
21st-century Belgian people